Hurme is a Finnish surname. Notable people with the surname include:

Harri Hurme (born 1945), Finnish chess master
Juha Hurme (born 1959), Finnish playwright and writer
Jani Hurme (born 1975), Finnish ice hockey player
Jarkko Hurme (born 1986), Finnish footballer
Risto Hurme (born 1950), Finnish modern pentathlete and fencer

Finnish-language surnames